18 Vulpeculae is a binary star system in the northern constellation of Vulpecula, located about 489 light years away from the Sun. It is visible to the naked eye as a faint, white-hued star with a combined apparent visual magnitude of 5.51. The system is moving closer to the Earth with a heliocentric radial velocity of −11.7 km/s.

This is a double-lined spectroscopic binary system with an orbital period of 9.3 days and a small eccentricity of 0.0116. The system contains a Delta Scuti variable, but the temperature places it to the blue (hotter) side of the δ Scuti instability strip. The combined stellar classification of this system remains unclear, with classes of A3 III, A1 IV, A3 V, and A2 IV being given. The ultraviolet spectrum matches an A3 dwarf star. It shows no spectral peculiarities.

References

External links
 

A-type giants
A-type main-sequence stars
Delta Scuti variables
Spectroscopic binaries
Vulpecula
Durchmusterung objects
Vulpeculae, 18
191747
099404
7711